B-Sides or B-Side may refer to:

Music
 B-side, the second side of a record or cassette
 The B-Sides (composition), a 2009 symphony by Mason Bates
 The B-Sides (band), a 2000s American rock group
 "B Side", a song by San Cisco, 2016
 "B-Side", a song by Khruangbin and Leon Bridges, 2022

Albums
 B-Side (album), by Mr. Children, 2007
 B-Sides (Avril Lavigne album), 2001
 B-Sides (Danko Jones album), 2009
 B-Sides (The Enemy album), 2008
 B-Sides (Helix album), 1999
 B-Sides (Slade album), 2007
 The B-Sides (The Gaslight Anthem album), 2014
 B Sides, by Brooke Fraser, 2018
 B-Sides, by Tom Rosenthal, 2013
 B-Sides: 1996–2006, by Placebo, 2011

EPs
 B-Side (EP), by Baiyu, or the title song, 2010
 B-Sides (Damien Rice EP), 2004
 B-Sides (Pin-Up Went Down EP), 2012
 B-Sides (Smile Empty Soul EP), 2007
 The B-Sides (EP), by Adam and the Ants, 1982
 The B-Sides/The Conversation, by the Afghan Whigs, 1994
 B-Sides, by G-Eazy, 2019
 The B-Sides, 2011–2014, by Jon Pardi, 2015

Film and television
 The B-Side: Elsa Dorfman's Portrait Photography, a 2016 documentary film by Errol Morris
 "B Sides" (Cloak & Dagger), a 2019 television episode

Other uses
Friday Night Funkin B-Sides, a popular modification for Friday Night Funkin'.
Side B Christians.

See also
 
 B-Sides and Rarities (disambiguation)
 List of B-side compilation albums
 Side B (EP), by Christina Grimmmie, 2017
 B-Sides The Beatles, an album by the Smithereens, 2008